Bob Robison is an American former slalom canoeist who competed from the late 1970s to the early 1990s. He won two medals at the 1979 ICF Canoe Slalom World Championships in Jonquière, Quebec, with a gold in the C-1 team event and a bronze in the C-1 event.

Robison co-founded travel management software company Outtask, Inc. which was subsequently acquired by Concur Technologies in January 2006. He remained with the merged company, leading Concur's global services until after the SAP- Concur acquisition in 2014. Robison currently resides in the Washington, D.C., area with his wife and three daughters.

References

ICF medalists for Olympic and World Championships - Part 2: rest of flatwater (now sprint) and remaining canoeing disciplines: 1936-2007.

American male canoeists
Living people
Year of birth missing (living people)
Medalists at the ICF Canoe Slalom World Championships